Saint Ischyrion (or Ischirione; died ) was an Egyptian officer in the Roman army who was martyred in Alexandria during the persecution of the Emperor Decius (r. 249–251).
His feast day is 22 December

Monks of Ramsgate account

The monks of St Augustine's Abbey, Ramsgate, gave two accounts in their Book of Saints (1921), which may be for the same person,

Roman Martyrology account

The Roman Martyrology of 1846 states under December 22nd,

Butler's account

The hagiographer Alban Butler (1710–1773) wrote in his Lives of the Fathers, Martyrs, and Other Principal Saints, under December 22,

Notes

Sources

 
 
 

Saints from Roman Egypt
250 deaths